The 2012 Avon Tyres British GT season was the 20th season of the British GT Championship. The season began on 9 April at Oulton Park and finished on 30 September at Donington Park, after ten rounds held over seven meetings. Motorbase Performance drivers Michael Caine and Daniele Perfetti won the GT3 category in a Porsche 997 GT3-R, Team WFR's Jody Fanin and Warren Hughes won the GT4 championship driving a Ginetta G50, while Ryan Hooker and Gary Eastwood took the GTC title in a Ferrari 458 Challenge driving for FF Corse.

Class structure
For the 2012 season, British GT contained four key classes. The GT3 class allows FIA homologated GT3 cars, such as the Ferrari 458 Italia, Mercedes-Benz SLS AMG GT3 or new Aston Martin V12 Vantage GT3. The GT3B class caters for older, GT3 spec cars which do not conform to the latest FIA homologations, such as the Dodge Viper Competition Coupe or Ferrari F430.

The GT4 class is a merger of Supersport-spec cars and GT4 homologated cars, such as the Lotus Evora or Ginetta G50. The GTC class caters for cars currently used in the Porsche Supercup and Ferrari Challenge series, based on the Porsche 997 and Ferrari F430 road cars.

Entry list

Race calendar and results
The 2012 calendar announced on 30 November 2011 included a support slot at the 24 Hours Nürburgring, with race formats later confirmed on 26 January 2012. All races except German round at Nürburgring, were held in the United Kingdom.

Championship standings
Points were awarded as follows:

GT3/GTC

† — Drivers did not finish the race, but were classified as they completed over 90% of the race distance.

GT4

References

External links
British GT website

GT
British GT Championship seasons